Babalkan or Babolkan may refer to:
 Babalkan-e Olya
 Babalkan-e Sofla